Pardosella is a genus of spiders in the family Lycosidae. It was first described in 1939 by Caporiacco. , it contains 5 species from Ethiopia and Tanzania.

References

Lycosidae
Araneomorphae genera
Spiders of Africa